Conicosia is a genus of succulent plants in the ice plant family native to southern Africa. They are known commonly as narrow-leafed ice plants. These are relatively short-lived perennials with underground stems and tentacle-shaped, dull-pointed triangular leaves. They bear large tubular flowers often exceeding 10 centimeters in width, with up to 250 fringelike petals arranged in a ring around a center with hundreds of stamens. The fruit is a capsule which opens when it gets wet, slowly releasing the hundreds of tiny seeds as they fall out of its drying flesh.

Species include:
Conicosia bijlii
Conicosia elongata
Conicosia pugioniformis

External links
Jepson Manual Treatment
USDA Plants Profile
Flora of North America

Aizoaceae
Aizoaceae genera
Taxa named by N. E. Brown